The Alexander Hotel is an historic hotel located at 535 Central Avenue between 5th Street S. and 6th Street S. in downtown St. Petersburg, Florida.  The four-story, buff-colored brick building was built in 1919 and was designed by Neel Reid in the Classical Revival style.  It has been converted to an office building. On November 1, 1984, it was added to the National Register of Historic Places.  It is located within the Downtown St. Petersburg Historic District.

References

External links

 Pinellas County listings at National Register of Historic Places
 Florida's Office of Cultural and Historical Programs
 Pinellas County listings
 Alexander Hotel

National Register of Historic Places in Pinellas County, Florida
Buildings and structures in St. Petersburg, Florida
Hotel buildings completed in 1919
1919 establishments in Florida